Claudio Bellucci (born 31 May 1975) is an Italian former association footballer who played as a striker and current manager.

Football career
Bellucci started his career with Sampdoria, making his Serie A debut against A.C. Milan on 13 March 1994, at the age of 18. He made one more appearance for the Genoa-based side, before being loaned to Fiorenzuola of Serie C1. In his first game after his return to Sampdoria, on 20 April 1995, he scored two goals in the 83rd and 86th minute of the 1994–95 UEFA Cup Winners' Cup return leg semifinal against Arsenal. Arsenal, who won the first leg 3–2, reached to score two minutes before the end of the match, and eventually won the successive penalty shootout. He then left for Venezia of Serie B.

Napoli
He stayed at Venice for only one season, before signing for Napoli. He followed the club's relegation to Serie B in summer 1998, and after two seasons they regained promotion to the top flight. When Napoli were once again relegated, he transferred to Bologna.

Bologna
Bellucci signed a contract extension in September 2004. Bellucci followed Bologna relegated to Serie B in summer 2005, in which he scored 25 and 19 goals, became the second highest goal scorers of the two successive seasons.

Return to Sampdoria
He returned to Sampdoria on 15 June 2007 on a free transfer. He signed a two-year contract with an option for further one year.

He scored 12 goals in 32 Serie A games in 2007–08 Serie A but ruptured his right Achilles tendon on 21 May 2008, in the 2–0 win over Palermo. Bellucci returned in action in October, but found few opportunities due to the rise in importance of Antonio Cassano and the mid-season signing of Giampaolo Pazzini. In the 2009–10 season, he made 8 league appearances, three of them coming as a starter.

Livorno
On 19 January 2010 Livorno signed the forward from Sampdoria on loan.

Modena
On 10 September 2010 Bellucci signed a contract from Modena on a free transfer.

Coaching career
After retirement at the end of the 2010/11 season, Bellucci retired and became a youth coach at his former club A.S. Lodigiani. He worked there until July 2013, where he was named as the new youth coach of the Giovanissimi Regionali team of Sampdoria in 2013, and then becoming a co-coach of the Primavera team (together with Enrico Chiesa) the following year. In 2015, he became a part of Walter Zenga's staff for the first team of Sampdoria, a job he left with the appointment of Vincenzo Montella as new head coach and his demotion as youth coach. He left Sampdoria in 2017 to become the new head coach of Serie C club Arezzo, a position he kept only for the first four weeks of the season.

In October 2018 he was named new head coach of Serie C minnows Albissola, at the bottom place of the league table on their first season as a professional club. Belucci was fired on 4 March 2019.

On 15 September 2021, Bellucci was appointed Walter Mazzarri's new assistant coach at Serie A club Cagliari. He was dismissed from his role on 3 May 2022, one day after Mazzarri's sacking.

References

External links
Bellucci's profile on Sampdoria's official website
FIGC 

1975 births
Living people
Italian footballers
Italy under-21 international footballers
U.C. Sampdoria players
U.S. Fiorenzuola 1922 S.S. players
Venezia F.C. players
S.S.C. Napoli players
Bologna F.C. 1909 players
U.S. Livorno 1915 players
Modena F.C. players
Serie A players
Serie B players
Serie C players
Association football forwards
Footballers from Rome
Serie C managers
Italian football managers